This is a list of notable venues worldwide including theaters, clubs, arenas, convention centers, and stadiums, all which can host a concert (music related).

Africa

Algeria

Angola

Egypt

Libya

Morocco

Nigeria

Republic of Congo

Republic of Senegal

South Africa

Tunisia

Asia

Brunei

Cambodia

China

India

Indonesia

|Edutorium UMS 
|Surakarta
|15,000
|}
|Benteng Vastenburg 
|Surakarta
|20,000
|}
|De Tjolomadoe
|Karanganyar
|4000
|}

Japan

Kazakhstan

Malaysia

Myanmar

Philippines

Singapore

South Korea

Taiwan

Thailand

Vietnam

Europe

Albania

Armenia

Austria

Azerbaijan

Belarus

Belgium

Bosnia and Herzegovina

Bulgaria

Croatia

Czech Republic

Denmark

Estonia

Finland

France

Georgia

Germany

Greece

Hungary

Iceland

Ireland

Italy

Latvia

Lithuania

Luxembourg

Malta

Montenegro

Monaco

Netherlands

Norway

Poland

Portugal

Romania

Russia

Serbia

Slovakia

Slovenia

Spain

Sweden

Switzerland

Turkey

Ukraine

United Kingdom

Middle East

Bahrain

Israel

Lebanon

Qatar

Syria

United Arab Emirates

North America and the Caribbean

The Bahamas

Canada

United States

Barbados

El Salvador

Guatemala

Honduras

Costa Rica

Mexico

Nicaragua

Puerto Rico

Panama

Dominican Republic

South America

Argentina

Bolivia

Brazil

Chile

Colombia

Ecuador

Paraguay

Peru

Trinidad and Tobago

Uruguay

Venezuela

Oceania

Australia

Fiji

New Zealand

Photo gallery

See also 
 List of music venues in Los Angeles
 List of music venues in Melbourne
 List of music venues in San Antonio
 Music venues in the Netherlands

References 

 

Münchenbryggeriet